Mount Ham may refer to:

 Mont Ham, Quebec
 Mount Hamilton (California), near San Jose